Khaleej Football Club is a Saudi Arabian multisports club. Located in Saihat, Eastern Province of Saudi Arabia. It is a sport, social, educational club. Additionally, different teams in this club, categorized in different levels based on the age, play different sports. Among the sports played by the Khaleej Club teams are football, handball, volleyball, basketball, tennis, table tennis, gymnastics, athletics, aquatics and others.

The club is well known for the handball team which played in different worldwide championships. Also, the athletics team accomplished worldwide golden middles.

Honours

Saudi First Division League
Winners (2): 2005–06, 2021–22
Runners-up (2): 2002–03, 2013–14
Prince Faisal bin Fahd Cup for Division 1 and 2 Teams
Winners (1): 1999–00
Runners-up (1): 2008–09

Administration
The current administration that runs the club is the club-president Fawzi Al-Bashsa and vice-president Nazih Al-Nasr.

Current squad 
As of 1 September 2022:

Unregistered players

Out on loan

Managerial history

 Ahmad Al-Ajlani (1997 – 1999)
 Khaled Al-Marzouq (May 1, 1999 – October 11, 1999)
 Abdelkrim Bira (October 11, 1999 – March 1, 2000)
 Angel (July 6, 2000 – March 1, 2001)
 Khaled Al-Marzouq (March 1, 2001 – June 1, 2004)
 Yousef Al Suryati (August 9, 2004 – February 7, 2005)
 Khaled Al-Marzouq (February 7, 2005 – October 31, 2006)
 Jan Kmoch (caretaker) (October 31, 2006 – January 8, 2007)
 Lotfi Benzarti (January 8, 2007 – May 20, 2007)
 Ricardo Formosinho (August 3, 2007 – November 4, 2007)
 Khaled Al-Marzouq (November 4, 2007 – May 30, 2008)
 Samir Sellimi (June 23, 2008 – November 17, 2008)
 Sameer Hilal (November 17, 2008 – May 31, 2009)
 Khaled Al-Marzouq (June 8, 2009 – May 1, 2010)
 Eelco Schattorie (July 27, 2010 – January 5, 2011)
 Abderrazek Chebbi (January 5, 2011 – May 16, 2011)
 Ahmed El Agouz (July 29, 2011 – November 5, 2011)
 Khaled Al-Marzouq (November 5, 2011 – May 30, 2012)
 Ayman Ragab (July 1, 2012 – May 24, 2013)
 Sameer Hilal (May 28, 2013 – April 6, 2014)
 Jalel Kadri (April 29, 2014 – May 30, 2016)
 Patrick De Wilde (June 9, 2016 – August 30, 2016)
 Jalel Kadri (August 30, 2016 – May 5, 2017)
 Eusebiu Tudor (May 18, 2017 – January 6, 2018)
 Maher Al-Shammari (January 6, 2018 – May 1, 2018)
 Sameer Hilal (May 27, 2018 – June 1, 2019)
 Alen Horvat (July 7, 2019 – December 14, 2019)
 Mohammed Tlemceni (caretaker) (December 14, 2019 – January 1, 2020)
 Kheïreddine Madoui (January 9, 2020 – September 20, 2020)
 Sameer Hilal (September 23, 2020 – June 1, 2021)
 Dejan Arsov (July 13, 2021 – November 23, 2021)
 Paulo Gomes (November 23, 2021 – May 6, 2022)
 Khaled Al-Marzouq (caretaker) (May 6, 2022 – June 1, 2022)
 Pedro Emanuel (July 3, 2022 – )

External links
Khaleej Club Official Website

 
Khaleej
Khaleej
Khaleej
Khaleej